Vannoy Hartrog Manning (July 26, 1839November 3, 1892), better known as Van. H. Manning, served as the U.S. representative from Mississippi's 2nd congressional district (1877–1883). Prior to this he was colonel of the 3rd Arkansas Infantry Regiment, serving from 1862 until wounded and captured by Union forces in 1864.

Early life and education
Born in 1839 in Wake County, North Carolina, Manning moved as a child in 1841 with his parents to Mississippi. He attended the private school, Horn Lake Male Academy, in De Soto County in the Mississippi Delta. Manning attended the University of Nashville in Tennessee, where he studied law. After graduation, he and his wife moved to Arkansas in 1860. He was admitted to the Arkansas bar in 1861 and commenced practice in Hamburg.

American Civil War

In May 1861, Manning and Dr. W. H. Tebbs recruited and organized the 3rd Arkansas Infantry Regiment, drawing from soldiers recruited in Ashley, Drew, Union, Dallas and Hot Spring counties. The regiment made up a total of eleven companies, and included one company of recruits from other parts of Arkansas, as well as recruits from Tennessee and Kentucky.

They marched to Vicksburg, Mississippi, where they were initially turned down for service as a part of the Confederate Army. Manning gained the assistance of Arkansas politician Albert Rust, and the regiment was accepted as part of the army. Rust was commissioned as colonel, and sent to Lynchburg, Virginia for training. The Third Arkansas was assigned to General Robert E. Lee's Army of Northern Virginia, after which it took part in almost every major eastern battle.

Tebbs and Manning both served as captains. Later Manning was promoted to Colonel of the Third Arkansas, following Rust's being promoted to Brigadier General. Manning was wounded at the battles of Antietam (Sharpsburg), Gettysburg, and The Wilderness.

Manning's reputation for heroism in battle became well known. He was cited in official reports for his actions during the Battle of Antietam and the Battle of Gettysburg. Reporting on him at Antietam, Confederate General John G. Walker, wrote as follows;

Manning was later commended again for gallantry, during the Battle of Gettysburg, by Brigadier General Jerome B. Robertson of the Texas Brigade, to which the Third Arkansas had been attached. In that action, Robertson's brigade had been ordered forward to attack and secure Devil's Den. The 1st, 4th, and 5th Texas regiments, alongside the Third Arkansas, did so at great cost, taking heavy casualties but securing their objective. Robertson gave much of the credit for this success to Manning's leadership in the field. Manning was wounded toward the end of that engagement, after helping his regiment hold under overwhelming odds.

He was later wounded for a third time and captured during the Battle of the Wilderness in Virginia in 1864. Manning was held as a prisoner of war by Union forces until the end of the war. When the war ended, only 144 of his Third Arkansas soldiers had survived of 1,353 mustered into it at the start of the war.

Later life and career

After the war, Manning moved with his family to Holly Springs, Mississippi, where he resumed the practice of law. In 1876 as the Democrats regained control of the state, he entered politics. He was elected as a Democrat from Mississippi's 2nd congressional district to the Forty-fifth, followed by re-election to the Forty-sixth, and Forty-seventh Congresses, serving from March 4, 1877–March 3, 1883.

In 1883 he presented credentials as a Member-elect of 1882 to the Forty-eighth Congress, but was contested by his opponent James R. Chalmers, who had run as an Independent Democrat on a fusion ticket supported by Republicans and Greenbackers.

Manning resumed the practice of law in Washington, D.C., in 1883. On June 25, 1884, Congress awarded the seat to Chalmers. He left politics, returning to his law practice for his remaining years. He died on November 3, 1892, in Prince George's County, Maryland, and was interred in Glenwood Cemetery, Washington, D.C.

Personal life 
Manning married Mary Z. Wallace of Holly Springs. Their firstborn son died in January 1861 after their move to Arkansas.  The second born, Levi H. Manning, later was elected mayor of Tucson, Arizona. The Mannings had a total of four sons and four daughters. One of his sons was Van H. Manning, the 2nd director of the U.S. Bureau of Mines.

See also
List of University of Nashville alumni

References

External links

Report of Brig. Gen. J. B. Robertson's Official Report (OR) for the Battle of Gettysburg at Shotgun's Home of the American Civil War (CivilWarHome.com)
Van. H. Manning at The Political Graveyard

1839 births
1892 deaths
19th-century American lawyers
19th-century American politicians

Arkansas lawyers
American Civil War prisoners of war
Burials at Glenwood Cemetery (Washington, D.C.)
Confederate States Army officers
Democratic Party members of the United States House of Representatives from Mississippi
Mississippi lawyers
People of Arkansas in the American Civil War
People from Wake County, North Carolina
University of Nashville alumni